Sergei Osipov or Sergey Osipov may refer to:
 Sergei Osipov (artist) (1915–1985), Russian artist and educator, the Leningrad School painter.
 Sergei Osipov (footballer, born 1978), Russian association football player
 Sergei Osipov (footballer, born 1968), Russian association football player and manager
 Sergei Osipov (luger), Russian Olympic luger